Lands Beyond is a study of geographical myths by L. Sprague de Camp and Willy Ley, first published in hardcover by Rinehart in 1952, and reissued by Barnes & Noble in 1993. It has been translated into French, Spanish, Portuguese, and Italian. It was the winner of the 1953 International Fantasy Award for nonfiction.

Contents
Introduction
Chapter I. The Land of Longing
Chapter II. The Long Homecoming
Chapter III. The Fabulous Feast
Chapter IV. The Sea of Sindbad
Chapter V. The Land of Prester John
Chapter VI. The Mislaid Tribes
Chapter VII. The Great Dream
Chapter VIII. The Western Ocean
Chapter IX. Golden Men and Amazons
Chapter X. The Shape of the Earth
Epilogue
Bibliography
Index

Reception
New York Times columnist Charles Poore placed Lands Beyond on his annual list of books recommended for Christmas giving. Kirkus Reviews recommended it as “a zestful geographical round-up which combines fact, legend and literature in equally interested parts”.

Boucher and McComas praised the book, saying it was “written with scholarly authority, literary grace, and an amusedly tolerant exposition of error, to make one of the season's most enjoyable items.” New Worlds reviewer Leslie Flood described it as “fascinating”. Weird Tales commended Lands Beyond to its audience, saying de Camp and Ley “ably treated” their subjects “for reader enjoyment”. George O. Smith wrote that it was “a book good for the younger and more impressionable to read, because it reduces to the realm of practicality many of the fabulous mysteries of the past, thus stripping the glamorous Long-Ago of its false superiority”.

References

External links
 book review by Mark Olson
 book review by Chris Winter

1952 non-fiction books
Science books
20th-century history books
History books about geography
Books by L. Sprague de Camp
Mythological places
Rinehart & Company books
Geography books